Anet-Jacqueline Buschmann (born 18 December 1982, in Varna) is a Bulgarian rower. Along with Miglena Markova she finished 4th in the women's double sculls at the 2004 Summer Olympics.

References 
 
 

1982 births
Living people
Bulgarian female rowers
Sportspeople from Varna, Bulgaria
Rowers at the 2004 Summer Olympics
Olympic rowers of Bulgaria